In rail transport, track gauge (in American English, alternatively track gage) is the distance between the two rails of a railway track. All vehicles on a rail network must have wheelsets that are compatible with the track gauge. Since many different track gauges exist worldwide, gauge differences often present a barrier to wider operation on railway networks.

The term derives from the metal bar, or gauge, that is used to ensure the distance between the rails is correct.

Railways also deploy two other gauges to ensure compliance with a required standard. A loading gauge is a two-dimensional profile that encompasses a cross-section of the track, a rail vehicle and a maximum-sized load: all rail vehicles and their loads must be contained in the corresponding envelope. A structure gauge specifies the outline into which structures (bridges, platforms, lineside equipment etc.) must not encroach.

Uses of the term
The term derives from the "gauge", a metal bar with a precisely positioned lug at each end that track crews use to ensure the actual distance between the rails lies within tolerances of a prescribed standard: on curves, for example, the spacing is wider than normal. Deriving from the name of the bar, the distance between these rails is also referred to as the track gauge.

Selection of gauge

Early track gauges

The earliest form of railway was a wooden wagonway, along which single wagons were manhandled, almost always in or from a mine or quarry. Initially the wagons were guided by human muscle power; subsequently by various mechanical methods.  Timber rails wore rapidly: later, flat cast-iron plates were provided to limit the wear. In some localities, the plates were made L-shaped, with the vertical part of the L guiding the wheels; this is generally referred to as a "plateway". Flanged wheels eventually became universal, and the  spacing between the rails had to be compatible with that of the wagon wheels.

As the guidance of the wagons was improved, short strings of wagons could be connected and pulled by teams of horses, and the track could be extended from the immediate vicinity of the mine or quarry, typically to a navigable waterway. The wagons were built to a consistent pattern and the track would be made to suit the needs of the horses and wagons: the gauge was more critical.

The Penydarren Tramroad probably carried the first journey by a locomotive, in 1804, and it was successful for the locomotive, but unsuccessful for the track: the plates were not strong enough to carry its weight. A considerable progressive step was made when cast iron edge rails were first employed; these had the major axis of the rail section configured vertically, giving a much stronger section to resist bending forces, and this was further improved when fish-belly rails were introduced.

Edge rails required a close match between rail spacing and the configuration of the wheelsets, and the importance of the gauge was reinforced. Railways were still seen as local concerns: there was no appreciation of a future connection to other lines, and selection of the track gauge was still a pragmatic decision based on local requirements and prejudices, and probably determined by existing local designs of (road) vehicles.

Thus, the Monkland and Kirkintilloch Railway (1826) in the West of Scotland used ; the Dundee and Newtyle Railway (1831) in the north-east of Scotland adopted ; the Redruth and Chasewater Railway (1825) in Cornwall chose .

Standard gauge appears
Locomotives were being developed in the first decades of the 19th century; they took various forms, but George Stephenson developed a successful locomotive on the Killingworth Wagonway, where he worked. His designs were so successful that they became the standard, and when the Stockton and Darlington Railway was opened in 1825, it used his locomotives, with the same gauge as the Killingworth line, .

The Stockton and Darlington line was immensely successful, and when the Liverpool and Manchester Railway, the first intercity line, was built (it opened in 1830), it used the same gauge. It was also hugely successful, and the gauge (now eased to ), became the automatic choice: "standard gauge".

Gauge differences
The Liverpool and Manchester was quickly followed by other trunk railways, with the Grand Junction Railway and the London and Birmingham Railway forming a huge critical mass of standard gauge. When Bristol promoters planned a line from London, they employed the innovative engineer Isambard Kingdom Brunel. This became known as broad gauge. The Great Western Railway (GWR) was successful and was greatly expanded, directly and through friendly associated companies, widening the scope of broad gauge.

At the same time, other parts of Britain built railways to standard gauge, and British technology was exported to European countries and parts of North America, also using standard gauge. Britain polarised into two areas: those that used broad gauge and those that used standard gauge. In this context, standard gauge was referred to as "narrow gauge" to indicate the contrast. Some smaller concerns selected other non-standard gauges: the Eastern Counties Railway adopted . Most of them converted to standard gauge at an early date, but the GWR's broad gauge continued to grow.

The larger railway companies wished to expand geographically, and large areas were considered to be under their control. When a new independent line was proposed to open up an unconnected area, the gauge was crucial in determining the allegiance that the line would adopt: if it was broad gauge, it must be friendly to the Great Western railway; if narrow (standard) gauge, it must favour the other companies. The battle to persuade or coerce that choice became very intense, and became referred to as "the gauge wars".

As passenger and freight transport between the two areas became increasingly important, the difficulty of moving from one gauge to the other—the break of gauge—became more prominent and more objectionable. In 1845 a Royal Commission on Railway Gauges was created to look into the growing problem, and this led to the Regulating the Gauge of Railways Act 1846, which forbade the construction of broad gauge lines unconnected with the broad gauge network. The broad gauge network was eventually converted—a progressive process completed in 1892, called gauge conversion.

Gauge selection in other countries

 As railways were built in other countries, the gauge selection was pragmatic: the track would have to fit the rolling stock. If locomotives were imported from elsewhere, especially in the early days, the track would be built to fit them. In some cases standard gauge was adopted, but many countries or companies chose a different gauge as their national gauge, either by governmental policy, or as a matter of individual choice.

Terminology
Standard gauge is generally known world-wide as being . Terms such as broad gauge and narrow gauge do not have any fixed meaning beyond being materially wider or narrower than standard.

In British practice, the space between the rails of a track is colloquially referred to as the "four-foot", and the space between two tracks the "six-foot", descriptions relating to the respective dimensions.

Standard gauge 

Standard gauge is dominant in a majority of countries, including those in North America, most of western Europe, North Africa and the Middle east, and in China.

Broad gauge

Broad gauge is the dominant gauge in countries in Indian subcontinent, the former Soviet Union (CIS states, Baltic states, Georgia and Ukraine), Mongolia and Finland, Spain, Portugal, Argentina, Chile and Ireland. It is also use for the suburban railway systems in South Australia, and Victoria, Australia.

Medium gauge 
The term "medium gauge" had different meanings throughout history, depending on the local dominant gauge in use.

In 1840s, the  Irish gauge was considered a medium gauge compared to Brunel's  broad gauge and the  narrow gauge, nowadays being standard gauge.

Narrow gauge

Narrow gauge is the dominant or second dominant gauge in countries of Southern, Central Africa, East Africa, Southeast Asia, Japan, Taiwan, Philippines, Central America and South America,

During the period known as "the Battle of the gauges", Stephenson's standard gauge was commonly known as "narrow gauge", while Brunel's railway's  gauge was termed "broad gauge". Many narrow gauge railways were built in mountainous regions such as Wales, the Rocky Mountains of North America, Central Europe and South America. Industrial railways and mine railways across the world are often narrow gauge. Sugar cane and banana plantations are mostly served by narrow gauges.

Minimum-gauge

Very narrow gauges of under  were used for some industrial railways in space-restricted environments such as mines or farms. The French company Decauville developed  and  tracks, mainly for mines; Heywood developed  gauge for estate railways.

Break of gauge

Through operation between railway networks with different gauges was originally impossible; goods had to be transshipped and passengers had to change trains. This was obviously a major obstacle to convenient transport, and in Great Britain, led to political intervention.

On narrow gauge lines, Rollbocks or transporter wagons are used: standard gauge wagons are carried on narrow gauge lines on these special vehicles, generally with rails of the wider gauge to enable those vehicles to roll on and off at transfer points.

On the Transmongolian Railway, Russia and Mongolia use  while China uses the standard gauge of 1,435 mm. At the border, each carriage is lifted and its bogies are changed. The operation can take several hours for a whole train of many carriages.

Other examples include crossings into or out of the former Soviet Union: Ukraine/Slovakia border on the Bratislava–L'viv train, and the Romania/Moldova border on the Chișinău-Bucharest train.

A system developed by Talgo and Construcciones y Auxiliar de Ferrocarriles (CAF) of Spain uses variable gauge wheelsets; at the border between France and Spain, through passenger trains are drawn slowly through apparatus that alters the gauge of the wheels, which slide laterally on the axles.

A similar system is used between China and Central Asia, and between Poland and Ukraine, using the SUW 2000 and INTERGAUGE variable axle systems. China and Poland use standard gauge, while Central Asia and Ukraine use .

Dual gauge

When individual railway companies have chosen different gauges and have needed to share a route where space on the ground is limited, mixed gauge (or dual gauge) track, in which three (sometimes four) rails are supported in the same track structure, can be necessary. The most frequent need for such track was at the approaches to city terminals or at break-of-gauge stations.

Tracks of multiple gauges involve considerable costs in construction (including signalling work) and complexities in track maintenance, and may require some speed restrictions. They are therefore built only when absolutely necessary. Dual-gauge rail lines occur (or have occurred) in Argentina, Australia, Brazil, Japan, North Korea, Spain, Switzerland, Tunisia and Vietnam.

On the GWR, there was an extended period between political intervention in 1846 that prevented major expansion of its  broad gauge and the final gauge conversion to standard gauge in 1892. During this period, many locations practicality required mixed gauge operation, and in station areas the track configuration was extremely complex. This was compounded by the common rail having to be at the platform side in stations; therefore, in many cases, standard-gauge trains needed to be switched from one side of the track to the other at the approach. A special fixed point arrangement was devised for the purpose, where the track layout was simple enough.

In some cases, mixed gauge trains were operated with wagons of both gauges. For example, MacDermot wrote:

In November 1871 a novelty in the shape of a mixed-gauge goods train was introduced between Truro and Penzance. It was worked by a narrow-gauge engine, and behind the narrow-gauge trucks came a broad-gauge match-truck with wide buffers and sliding shackles, followed by the broad-gauge trucks. Such trains continued to run in West Cornwall until the abolition of the Broad Gauge; they had to stop or come down to walking pace at all stations where fixed points existed and the narrow portion side-stepped to right or left.

Nominal track gauge
The nominal track gauge is the distance between the inner faces of the rails. In current practice, it is specified at a certain distance below the rail head as the inner faces of the rail head (the gauge faces) are not necessarily vertical. Given the allowed tolerance, it is a common practice to widen the gauge slightly in curves, particularly those of shorter radius (which are inherently slower speed curves).

Rolling stock on the network must have running gear (wheelsets) that are compatible with the gauge, and therefore the gauge is a key parameter in determining interoperability, but there are many others – see below. In some cases in the earliest days of railways, the railway company saw itself as an infrastructure provider only, and independent hauliers provided wagons suited to the gauge. Colloquially the wagons might be referred to as "four-foot gauge wagons", say, if the track had a gauge of four feet. This nominal value does not equate to the flange spacing, as some freedom is allowed for.

An infrastructure manager might specify new or replacement track components at a slight variation from the nominal gauge for pragmatic reasons.

Units
The gauge is defined in Imperial units, metric units or SI units.

Imperial units were established in the United Kingdom by The Weights and Measures Act of 1824. The United States customary units for length did not agree with the Imperial system until 1959, when one international yard was defined as 0.9144 meters and, as derived units, 1 foot (= yd) as 0.3048 meter and 1 inch (= yd) as 25.4 mm.

The list shows the Imperial and other units that have been used for track gauge definitions:

Temporary way – permanent way

A temporary way is the temporary track often used for construction, to be replaced by the permanent way (the structure consisting of the rails, fasteners, sleepers/ties and ballast (or slab track), plus the underlying subgrade) when construction nears completion. In many cases narrow-gauge track is used for a temporary way because of the convenience in laying it and changing its location over unimproved ground.

In restricted spaces such as tunnels, the temporary way might be double track even though the tunnel will ultimately be single track. The Airport Rail Link in Sydney had construction trains of  gauge, which were replaced by permanent tracks of  gauge.

During World War I trench warfare led to a relatively static disposition of infantry, requiring considerable logistics to bring them support staff and supplies (food, ammunition, earthworks materials, etc.). Dense light railway networks using temporary narrow gauge track sections were established by both sides for this purpose.

Maintenance standards

Infrastructure owners specify permitted variances from the nominal gauge, and the required interventions when non-compliant gauge is detected.

Advantages and disadvantages of different track gauges

Speed, capacity, and economy are generally objectives of rail transport, but there is often an inverse relationship between these priorities. There is a common misconception that a narrower gauge permits a tighter turning radius, but for practical purposes, there is no meaningful relationship between gauge and curvature.

Construction cost
Narrower gauge railways usually cost less to build because they are usually lighter in construction, using smaller cars and locomotives (smaller loading gauge), as well as smaller bridges, smaller tunnels (smaller structure gauge). Narrow gauge is thus often used in mountainous terrain, where the savings in civil engineering work can be substantial. It is also used in sparsely populated areas, with low potential demand, and for temporary railways that will be removed after short-term use, such as for construction, the logging industry, the mining industry, or large-scale construction projects, especially in confined spaces (see Temporary way – permanent way). For temporary railways which will be removed after short-term use, such as those used in logging, mining or large-scale construction projects (especially in confined spaces, such as when constructing the Channel Tunnel), a narrow-gauge railway is substantially cheaper and easier to install and remove. Such railways have almost vanished, however, due to the capabilities of modern trucks. In many countries, narrow-gauge railways were built as branch lines to feed traffic to standard-gauge lines due to lower construction costs. The choice was often not between a narrow- and standard-gauge railway, but between a narrow-gauge railway and none at all.

Broader gauge railways are generally more expensive to build, because they are usually heavier in construction, use larger cars and locomotives (larger loading gauge), as well as larger bridges, larger tunnels (larger structure gauge). But broader gauges offer higher speed and capacity. For routes with high traffic, greater capacity may more than offset the higher initial cost of construction.

Interchangeability
The value or utility a user derives from a good or service depends on the number of users of compatible products – the "network effect" in economics. Network effects are typically positive, resulting in a given user deriving more value from a product as other users join the same network. At national levels, the network effect has resulted in commerce extending beyond regional and national boundaries. Increasingly, many governments and companies have made their railways' engineering and operational standards compatible in order to achieve interchangeability – hence faster, longer-distance train operation. A major barrier to achieving interchangeability, however, is path dependence – in this context the persistence of an already adopted standard to which equipment, infrastructure and training has become aligned. Since adopting a new standard is difficult and expensive, continuing with an existing standard can remain attractive unless longer-term benefits are given appropriate weight. An example of the consequences of path dependence is the persistence in the United Kingdom – the earliest nation to develop and adopt railway technologies – of structure gauges that are too small to allow the larger rolling stock of continental Europe to operate in that country. The reduced cost, greater efficiency, and greater economic opportunity offered by the use of a common standard has resulted in the historical multitude of track gauges dwindling to a small number that predominate worldwide.

When interchangeability has not been achieved, freight and passengers must be transferred through time-consuming procedures requiring manual labour and substantial capital expenditure. Some bulk commodities, such as coal, ore, and gravel, can be mechanically transshipped, but even this is time-consuming, and the equipment required for the transfer is often complex to maintain. Further, if rail lines of different gauges coexist in a network and a break of gauge exists, it is difficult in times of peak demand to move rolling stock to where it is needed. Sufficient rolling stock must be available to meet a narrow-gauge railway's peak demand (which might be greater in comparison to a broader-gauge network), and the surplus equipment generates no cash flow during periods of low demand. In regions where narrow-gauge lines form a small part of the rail network (as was the case on Russia's Sakhalin Railway), extra cost is involved in designing, manufacturing or importing narrow-gauge equipment.

Solutions to interchangeability problems include bogie exchanges, a rollbock system, dual gauge, variable gauge, or gauge conversion.

Dominant railway gauges 

New railways have been built in Africa to standard gauge. Most of the narrow-gauge railways in India are being converted to the dominant, broad-gauge.

Prevalence 
Total for each group of gauges in 2020:

Future
Further convergence of rail gauge use seems likely, as countries seek to build inter-operable networks, and international organisations seek to build macro-regional and continental networks. Almost all new high-speed rail lines are built to standard gauge, except in Uzbekistan and Russia.

Europe
The European Union has set out to develop inter-operable freight and passenger rail networks across its area, and is seeking to standardise gauge, signalling and electrical power systems.
EU funds have been dedicated to assist Lithuania, Latvia, and Estonia in the building of some key railway lines (Rail Baltica) of standard gauge, and to assist Spain and Portugal in the construction of high-speed lines to connect Iberian cities to one another and to the French high-speed lines. The EU has developed plans for improved freight rail links between Spain, Portugal, and the rest of Europe.

Trans-Asian Railway

The United Nations Economic and Social Commission for Asia and the Pacific (UNESCAP) is planning a Trans-Asian Railway that will link Europe and the Pacific, with a Northern Corridor from Europe to the Korean Peninsula, a Southern Corridor from Europe to Southeast Asia, and a North–South corridor from Northern Europe to the Persian Gulf. All these would encounter breaks of gauge as they cross Asia. Current plans have mechanized facilities at the breaks of gauge to move containers from train to train rather than widespread gauge conversion. The Northern Corridor through Russia already operates since before year 2000, with increasing volumes China–Europe.

The Americas
 2008: Proposed link between Venezuela and Colombia
 2008: Venezuela via Brazil to Argentina – standard gauge

Africa

The East African Railway Master Plan is a proposal for rebuilding and expanding railway lines connecting Ethiopia, Djibouti, Kenya, Uganda, Rwanda, Burundi, Tanzania, South Sudan and beyond. The plan is managed by infrastructure ministers from participating East African Community countries in association with transport consultation firm CPCS Transcom. Newly rebuilt lines will use standard gauge. Regular freight and passenger services began on the standard gauge Mombasa–Nairobi railway in 2017 and on the standard gauge Addis Ababa–Djibouti railway in 2018.

Lines for iron ore to Kribi in Cameroon are likely to be  with a likely connection to the same port from the  Cameroon system.

Nigeria's railways are mostly  Cape gauge. The Lagos–Kano Standard Gauge Railway is a gauge conversion project by the Nigerian Government to create a north–south standard gauge rail link. The first converted segment, between Abuja and Kaduna, was completed in July 2016.

The African Union has a 50-year plan to connect the capital cities and major centres by high-speed railways.

Timeline

See also

 List of track gauges
 Rapid transit track gauge
 List of tram systems by gauge and electrification
 Loading gauge
 Minimum railway curve radius
 Overhead line 
 Rail profile
 Rail terminology
 Rail transport modelling scales
 Railway coupling
 Structure gauge
 Third rail
 Track gauge conversion

Notes

References

External links

 OpenRailwayMap. A global track gauge map
 A history of track gauge by George W. Hilton
  – A list of railway gauges used or being used worldwide, including gauges that are obsolete.
 European Railway Agency: 1520 mm systems (issues with the participation of 1520/1524 mm gauge countries in the EU rail network)
 The Days they Changed the Gauge in the U.S. South
 Juan Manuel Grijalvo – The Myth of the "Standard" Gauge

 
Gague